The Coffee House is a Vietnamese coffeehouse chain, created in 2014. It is based in Ho Chi Minh City.

As of March 2018, the chain has over 100 stores across Vietnam that serve over 40,000 customers a day. The CEO Nguyen Hai Ninh announced that the company plans to open as many as 700 outlets across Vietnam.

The chain has been described as one of local Vietnamese coffeehouse chains, together with Highlands Coffee or Cong Ca Phe, that are together more popular in Vietnam than global chains like Starbucks.

In 2018, The Coffee House was second on Vietnamese coffee chain market in terms of revenue, after Highlands Coffee, and fourth in terms of profit (after Highlands Coffee, Starbucks and Phúc Long).

In 2019, The Coffee House's revenue had an increase of nearly 30% compared to 2018, reaching 863 million VND.

References

External links 
 Official website of the company

Coffeehouses and cafés
Restaurants in Vietnam
Coffee brands
Vietnamese brands
Restaurants established in 2014
Food and drink companies of Vietnam